Francisco Sánchez Villanueva y Vega (1581–1658) was a Roman Catholic prelate who served as Archbishop (Personal Title) of Islas Canarias (1635–1651), Archbishop (Personal Title) of Mazara del Vallo (1630–1635), and Archbishop of Taranto (1627–1630).

Biography
Francisco Sánchez Villanueva y Vega was born in Madrid, Spain in January 1581.
On 10 August 1627, he was selected as Archbishop of Taranto and confirmed by Pope Urban VIII on 24 January 1628.
On 13 February 1628, he was consecrated bishop by Ludovico Ludovisi, Cardinal-Priest of San Lorenzo in Damaso.
On 23 September 1630, he was appointed during the papacy of Pope Urban VIII as Archbishop (Personal Title) of Mazara del Vallo.
On 9 July 1635, he was appointed during the papacy of Pope Urban VIII as Archbishop (Personal Title) of Islas Canarias.
He served as Archbishop of Islas Canarias until his resignation in 1651. He died on 4 February 1658.

While bishop, he was the principal consecrator of Alfonso de Franco y Luna, Bishop of Durango (1632); and Luis García Rodríguez, Bishop of Orense (1634).

References

External links and additional sources
 (for Chronology of Bishops) 
 (for Chronology of Bishops) 
 (for Chronology of Bishops) 
 (for Chronology of Bishops) 

17th-century Roman Catholic bishops in Spain
Bishops appointed by Pope Urban VIII
1581 births
1658 deaths
17th-century Italian Roman Catholic archbishops